The Sousse–Kairouan Decauville railway was a  long  gauge Decauville military railway from Sousse to Kairouan in Tunisia.

History 
The French army occupied Kairouan in 1881. Pioneers then built the narrow gauge railway from Sousse on the coast to the former capital Kairouan within 3½ months. It ran mainly on an old Roman road.

The open-sided carriages arrived before 1 January 1882 in Sousse. The first train transported wounded soldieres on 3 February 1882 from Kairouan to Sousse. The waggons were initially drawn by horses and later by steam locomotives.

External links 
 La gare des Decauville

References 

Narrow gauge railways in Tunisia
Decauville
Tram transport
600 mm gauge railways
Former buildings and structures in Tunisia
Rail transport in Tunisia